Euphorbia canariensis, commonly known as the Canary Island spurge, Hercules club or in Spanish cardón, is a succulent member of the genus Euphorbia and family Euphorbiaceae endemic to the Canary Islands. It is the plant symbol of the island of Gran Canaria.

Description
It is made up of fleshy quadrangular or pentagonal trunks that look like cacti. It produces reddish-green flowers.

The latex, which contains diterpenes is poisonous.

Distribution

See also
 List of animal and plant symbols of the Canary Islands

References

External links

canariensis
Endemic flora of the Canary Islands
canariensis
Plants described in 1753
Taxa named by Carl Linnaeus